The following is a selected list of rose varieties and cultivars which currently (2017) hold the Royal Horticultural Society's Award of Garden Merit.

List of roses
This sortable list allows users to view roses alphabetically by breeder, colour, etc. - as well as ordering them by size if required. Clicking on the double arrow a second time reverses the alphabetical order.

↑ shows the maximum height in metres. ←→ shows the maximum spread in square metres.
Notes indicates sources of names where known. Repeat flower indicates whether the variety has a single flush of flowers in summer, or further flushes of flowers through the season.

Withdrawn AGM-Roses

See also

Rose (main encyclopedia entry on roses)
Garden roses
ADR rose
List of rose breeders
List of rose cultivars named after people
Rose Hall of Fame

Notes

References

External links
 

Roses